Basin and Range may refer to:
 Basin and Range Province, physiographic province of the United States west of the Rocky Mountains 
 Basin and range topography, type of topography typical of the Basin and Range Province
 Basin and Range National Monument, in Lincoln and Nye counties in southeastern Nevada, within the Basin and Range Province